Evergetoulas (Greek: Ευεργέτουλας) is a former municipality on the island of Lesbos, North Aegean, Greece. Since the 2019 local government reform it is part of the municipality Mytilene, of which it is a municipal unit. It is located in the eastern part of the island, inland from the Aegean Sea, but on the Bay of Gera. It has a land area of 88.866 km². Its population was 2,771 at the 2011 census. The seat of the municipality was in Sykounta (pop. 281). Its largest towns are Íppeio (818), Káto Trítos (518), Kerameía (378), Sykoúnta, and Asómatos (259).

External links
Official website

References

Populated places in Lesbos